The Rhinoceros Party of Canada fielded several candidates in the 1988 federal election, none of whom were elected.  Information about these candidates may be found on this page.

List of Candidates (incomplete)

Quebec

Ontario

Nickel Belt: Keith J. Claven

Keith J. Claven listed his occupation as "merchant marine".  He received 202 votes (0.52%), finishing fifth against New Democratic Party incumbent John Rodriguez.

References